Luis Marcelo Salas Candia (born 19 May 1998) is a Chilean footballer who last played for Deportes Recoleta.

Career
A product of Colo-Colo youth system, he played on loan at Deportes Antofagasta in 2018. In 2019, he played for Deportes Recoleta in the Segunda División Profesional de Chile.

At international level, he represented the Chile national under-17 team in the 2015 World Cup.

References

External links
 
 

1998 births
Living people
Footballers from Santiago
Chilean footballers
Chile youth international footballers
Chilean Primera División players
Segunda División Profesional de Chile players
Colo-Colo footballers
C.D. Antofagasta footballers
Deportes Recoleta footballers
Association football forwards